The 1987 IFMAR/Parma 1:10 Electric Off-Road World Championship was the second edition of the IFMAR 1:10 Electric Off-Road World Championship that was held on the at now defunct Romsey Club which was based on the cite of the Malthouse Inn in Timsbury, Hampshire, near Southampton on the Central South Coast of England.

Results

2WD

4WD

Reference

Works cited

IFMAR 1:10 Electric Off-Road World Championship
International sports competitions hosted by Australia